Scott Stewart Fraser (born 30 March 1995) is a Scottish professional footballer who plays as a midfielder for League One club Charlton Athletic.

He has previously played for Dundee United, Airdrieonians, Burton Albion, Milton Keynes Dons and Ipswich Town.

Early life
Fraser first started playing competitive football with local boys side Dee Club before moving onto Longforgan Boys Club, along with future teammate Scott Smith. At age 10 he then joined the youth set-up at Dundee United.

Club career

Dundee United
He progressed through the youth ranks and joined up with the first team for pre-season at the start of the 2011–12 season, but suffered a leg break which kept him out of action for the entire season. After recovering from injury, Fraser was named as Dundee United's U20 Player of the Year for the 2013–14 season. He made his first team debut on 11 May 2014 as a substitute in the final game of the Scottish Premiership season, away to Celtic.

On 10 October 2014, Fraser signed for Airdrieonians on loan until January 2015, later extended until May 2015. He scored a goal after two minutes of his Airdrie debut, in a 4–0 win against Brechin City. Following his return to his parent club, Fraser made his first start for Dundee United on 8 August 2015, in a 2–0 Premiership win at Motherwell. A season later, he played a key role in the Dundee United team that went on to win the 2016–17 Scottish Challenge Cup, playing in three rounds and scoring in the 3–2 semi-final away win over Queen of the South.

He was named the Scottish Championship Player of the Month for November 2017. After three seasons in the United first team, Fraser decided to leave the club in May 2018.

Burton Albion
On 5 July 2018, Fraser signed a two-year deal with English League One club Burton Albion. He made his debut on 4 August 2018 in a 2–1 home defeat to Rochdale, and scored his first goal for the club on 8 September 2018 in a 1–1 draw away to Accrington Stanley. During the 2018–19 season, Fraser was a key part of the Burton Albion squad that reached the semi-finals of the EFL Cup.

On 20 August 2019, Fraser scored a second half hat-trick within 23 minutes in a 4–2 win away to Oxford United. He finished the 2019–20 season with 11 assists – the second highest total in League One for that campaign. Fraser left Burton Albion on 1 July 2020 following the expiry of his contract having declined a new deal.

Milton Keynes Dons
On 9 September 2020, Fraser signed a two-year contract with fellow League One club Milton Keynes Dons. He made his debut on 19 September 2020 in a 2–1 home league defeat to Lincoln City, and scored his first goal for the club on 10 October 2020 in a 2–1 away league defeat to Portsmouth. Following a successful year in which he scored a career-best 14 goals in 50 appearances, Fraser was named MK Dons Players' Player of the Year for the 2021–22 season.

Ipswich Town
On 14 July 2021, Fraser signed for Ipswich Town for an undisclosed fee, signing a three-year contract. He made his debut for the club on 7 August 2021, where he scored the first of Ipswich's two goals in a 2–2 opening day draw with Morecambe.

Charlton Athletic
On 31 January 2022, Fraser joined League One club Charlton Athletic for an undisclosed fee, signing a contract until 2025.

Career statistics

Honours
Dundee United
Scottish Challenge Cup: 2016–17

Individual
Dundee United U20 Player of the Year: 2013–14
Scottish Championship Player of the Month: November 2017
Milton Keynes Dons Players' Player of the Year: 2020–21

References

External links

1995 births
Living people
Scottish footballers
Footballers from Dundee
Association football midfielders
Dundee United F.C. players
Airdrieonians F.C. players
Burton Albion F.C. players
Milton Keynes Dons F.C. players
Ipswich Town F.C. players
Charlton Athletic F.C. players
Scottish Professional Football League players
English Football League players